West Pharmaceutical Services, Inc. is a designer and manufacturer of injectable pharmaceutical packaging and delivery systems. Founded in 1923 by Herman O. West and J.R. Wike of Philadelphia, the company is headquartered in Exton, Pennsylvania. In its early years of development, West produced rubber components for packaging injectable drugs, providing a sterile environment for the producers of penicillin and insulin.

Overview 
West manufactures components and systems for injectable drug delivery and plastic packaging, and delivery system components for the healthcare and consumer products markets. In 2019, the company reported  in sales.

On January 29, 2003, an accumulation of combustible polyethelene powder caused an explosion at a West rubber-manufacturing plant in Kinston, North Carolina.

In 2005, West acquired The Tech Group, Scottsdale, Ariz., and Medimop Medical Projects Ltd., Ra’anana, Israel.

References

External links 

Companies listed on the New York Stock Exchange
Health care companies established in 1923
Health care companies based in Pennsylvania
1923 establishments in Pennsylvania
Companies based in Chester County, Pennsylvania
American companies established in 1923